Knapper is a village in Nord-Odal Municipality in Innlandet county, Norway. Since 2009, the population and area data for this village area has not been separately tracked by Statistics Norway.

References

Nord-Odal
Villages in Innlandet